Major General Miles Francis Stapleton Fitzalan-Howard, 17th Duke of Norfolk,  (21 July 1915 – 24 June 2002) was a British Army general and peer. He was the eldest son of Bernard Fitzalan-Howard, 3rd Baron Howard of Glossop, and his wife Mona Stapleton, 11th Baroness Beaumont. In 1975, he inherited the Dukedom of Norfolk from his second cousin once removed, making him the premier duke in the Peerage of England.

Military career
Educated at Ampleforth College and Christ Church, Oxford, Miles Fitzalan-Howard was commissioned as a second lieutenant in the Territorial Army as a university candidate on 3 July 1936. and was subsequently commissioned in the same rank in the Grenadier Guards on 27 August 1937, with seniority from 30 January 1936. His service number was 52703. He was promoted to lieutenant on 30 January 1939 and to captain on 30 January 1944.

In April 1944, as a temporary major during the Second World War, he was awarded the Military Cross for reconnaissance of mined roads. He was at the time on foot and under enemy fire. He was quoted in his obituary in The Independent as saying: "Anyone can be the Duke of Norfolk, but I'm rather proud of that medal."

Fitzalan-Howard was promoted to the substantive rank of major on 30 January 1949. Promoted to lieutenant-colonel on 28 February 1955, he was appointed Chief of the British mission to the Soviet forces in Germany in 1957, and received a promotion to colonel on 24 April 1958 He was appointed a Commander of the Order of the British Empire (CBE), Military Division, in the 1960 New Year Honours.

In 1961, he was appointed Commander of the 70th Brigade (King's African Rifles and the Kenya Regiment), just before Kenyan independence. Promoted to brigadier on 1 January 1963, he became General Officer Commanding 1st Division on 5 November, with the rank of temporary major general. He was confirmed in the substantive rank of major-general in February 1964, retroactive to 5 November and with seniority from 10 April 1963.

After relinquishing his command on 5 November 1965, he became Director of Management and Support Intelligence at the Ministry of Defence on 6 January 1966 Appointed a Companion of the Order of the Bath (CB) in the 1966 Queen's Birthday Honours, he was appointed Director of Service Intelligence at the Ministry of Defence on 29 July. He relinquished this appointment on 18 September of the following year and retired the same day, after 31 years of service.

Baronies of Beaumont and Howard of Glossop
The Duke inherited the Barony of Beaumont from his mother, the 11th Baroness, in 1971, and the Barony Howard of Glossop from his father, the 3rd Baron, in 1972.

Dukedom of Norfolk
When he was Lord Beaumont he inherited the Dukedom of Norfolk from his second cousin once removed, The 16th Duke of Norfolk, in 1975 and added his mother's maiden name of Stapleton before his own that year. He also inherited the Great Office of Earl Marshal and Hereditary Marshal of England, which is attached to the Dukedom of Norfolk, thereby becoming responsible for State occasions. He became, by virtue of this office, the hereditary judge of the Court of Chivalry and head of the College of Arms, responsible for heraldry in England and Wales as well as other parts of the Commonwealth of Nations such as Australia and New Zealand.

The Dukes of Norfolk remained Roman Catholic despite the Reformation (see recusancy). The Duke, as senior Roman Catholic peer of the United Kingdom, represented The Queen at the installations of Pope John Paul I and Pope John Paul II and at the funeral of Pope John Paul I.  The 17th Duke was the patron of many Catholic charities and benevolent organisations, including the Catholic Building Society.

Personal life
One of eight children (all of whose first names started with the letter "M"), the Duke married Anne Mary Teresa Constable-Maxwell in 1949. They had two sons and three daughters:
Lady Tessa Mary Isabel Fitzalan-Howard (born 20 September 1950), married Roderick Balfour, 5th Earl of Balfour; has issue, four daughters, one of whom is the playwright, Lady Kinvara Balfour.
Lady Carina Mary Gabrielle Fitzalan-Howard (born 20 February 1952), married Sir David Frost; has issue.
Lady Marcia Mary Josephine Fitzalan-Howard (born 10 March 1953), better known as the actress Marsha Fitzalan, married Patrick Ryecart (marriage dissolved); has issue.
Edward Fitzalan-Howard, 18th Duke of Norfolk (b. 2 December 1956), married Georgina Susan Gore, has issue.
 Lord Gerald Bernard Fitzalan-Howard (born 13 June 1962), married Emma Roberts; has issue. He has resided with his family at Carlton Towers since 1991.

The Duke lived in the parish of Hambleden until his death on 24 June 2002. He was buried at Fitzalan Chapel on the western grounds of Arundel Castle. A memorial service was held at Westminster Cathedral, celebrated by the Cardinal Archbishop of Westminster; the congregation was led by Princess Alexandra of Kent representing the Queen and by Field Marshal Lord Bramall representing the Duke of Edinburgh.

Catholicism
He was Catholic but disagreed with the Church's view on birth control at a conference of Catholic teachers, "How can you ask a married couple to do it by thermometers and what not?", he asked, "My wife and I did that – it didn't bloody work. Has everybody got to have eight children like my mother?"

Honours and awards
Domestic
Royal Victorian Chain (2000)
Knight of the Order of the Garter (1983)
Knight Grand Cross of the Royal Victorian Order (1986)
Companion of the Order of the Bath (1966)
Commander of the Order of the British Empire (1960)
Military Cross
Deputy Lieutenant of West Sussex
Foreign
: Knight Grand Cross of the Order of Pius IX
: Grand Cross pro merito Melitensi

Family

Ancestry

Family tree

References

External links

|-

1915 births
2002 deaths
People educated at Ampleforth College
Alumni of Christ Church, Oxford
British Army personnel of World War II
Grenadier Guards officers
British Army major generals
British Roman Catholics
English Roman Catholics
Commanders of the Order of the British Empire
Companions of the Order of the Bath
Deputy Lieutenants of West Sussex
317
35
306
123
25
Barons Howard of Glossop
Barons Beaumont
Miles Fitzalan-Howard, 17th Duke of Norfolk
Earls Marshal
Knights Grand Cross of the Royal Victorian Order
Knights of the Garter
Knights of the Order of Pope Pius IX
Recipients of the Military Cross
Recipients of the Order pro Merito Melitensi
King's African Rifles officers
20th-century Roman Catholics
21st-century Roman Catholics
Earls of Norfolk (1644 creation)
Eldest sons of British hereditary barons
Military personnel from London